Milan TV is a subscription-based television channel operated by Italian football club A.C. Milan. It first broadcast on 16 December 1999 as Milan Channel, with the current name being adopted on 1 July 2016.

The channel offers AC Milan fans exclusive interviews with players and staff, full matches, including replays of all Serie A, Coppa Italia, and Champions League/UEFA Cup games, in addition to vintage matches, footballing news, and other themed programming.

In 2001, Riccardo Silva became CEO of Milan Channel, guiding the international development of the channel, also through the global broadcasting on YouTube.

Staff
Fabio Guadagnini
Benedetta Radaelli
Alessandro Bianchi
Giuseppe Pastore
Tommaso Turci
Federica Zille
Mauro Suma

Regular or semi-regular guests
Giovanni Lodetti (former footballer)
Carlo Pellegatti (football commentator)
Franco Ordine (sports writer)

References

External links
Official website

A.C. Milan
Sports television in Italy
Television channels in Italy
Television channels and stations established in 1999
Italian-language television stations
1999 establishments in Italy
Mass media in Milan
Football club television channels